R. Bindu is an Indian Politician of CPI(M), who serves as Minister for Higher Education and Social Justice, Government of Kerala.

Career 
She is the former Mayor of the Thrissur Municipal Corporation, Kerala. She is the first woman minister from Thrissur. She is also the first woman MLA from Irinjalakuda constituency. Bindu was the vice principal and Head of English Department at Sree Kerala Varma College, Thrissur. She was the member of the senate and syndicate of the  Calicut University.  She is the central committee member  of AIDWA and also has close association with All India Democratic Women’s Association (AIDWA).

Bindu is married to A. Vijayaraghavan, former parliamentarian and Secretary of the CPI(M) Kerala State Committee.

Early life
She was born in 1967 as the daughter of N Radhakrishnan and K.K.Shanthakumari. She completed her education in Irinjalakkuda Girls' HS, Irinjalakkuda St Joseph's College, Department of English; Calicut University and JNU Delhi. She holds a Masters degree in English Literature and an MPhil and PhD. Bindu entered social activities through student politics.

References

External links

Uproarious scenes at Thrissur Corporation

Year of birth missing (living people)
Living people
Mayors of Thrissur
Women mayors of places in Kerala
Sree Kerala Varma College alumni
Communist Party of India (Marxist) politicians from Kerala
21st-century Indian women politicians
21st-century Indian politicians
20th-century Indian politicians
20th-century Indian women politicians
Educators from Kerala
Politicians from Thrissur
Women educators from Kerala
20th-century women educators
21st-century women educators